Eduandrea is a monotypic genus plants in the family Bromeliaceae, subfamily Bromelioideae.

Taxonomy
It contains a single species, Eduandrea selloana.

The former genus Andrea has been ruled invalid and renamed Eduandrea in honor of the collector Édouard André (1840-1911).

Distribution
The bromeliad species Eduandrea selloana is endemic to Minas Gerais state, within the Atlantic Forest biome (Mata Atlantica Brasileira), located in southeastern Brazil.

The plant is a Critically endangered species in its Bahian habitats.

References

Bromelioideae
Endemic flora of Brazil
Flora of the Atlantic Forest
Flora of Minas Gerais
Bromeliaceae genera
Monotypic Poales genera
Plants described in 1896
Critically endangered flora of South America
Taxa named by John Gilbert Baker
Taxa named by Rafaël Govaerts